Chocolate com Pimenta (English title: Chocolate with Pepper)  is a Brazilian telenovela, set in the roaring 1920s, starring Mariana Ximenes and Murilo Benício. It was produced and broadcast by Rede Globo in 2003 and 2004. It was written by Walcyr Carrasco and directed by Jorge Fernando.

Synopsis 

The story of Ana Francisca (Mariana Ximenes), who at the start of the soap opera is a poor, yet kind, young girl. Aninha, as she is lovingly called by those closest to her, suffered the loss of her father and was forced to flee to the city of Ventura, after being left destitute.

Once in Ventura, she begins to live with her uncle Margarido (Osmar Prado), her grandmother Carmen (Laura Cardoso), cousins Márcia (Drica Moraes) and Timóteo (Marcelo Novaes) and an adopted family member, Dália (Carla Daniel) on their small farm.

Although without means, Ana wishes to study and pursue a teaching career, which she is able to do thanks to the help of the Mother Superior, who grants her a scholarship at the local school. She is instantly unpopular at school because she is poor and is hated by Olga (Priscila Fantin). Aninha begins to like Danilo (Murilo Benício), the Mayor's nephew, known in town for being a ladies man. However, Olga quickly realizes Ana's feelings and tries to keep Danilo from the girl, as she wants him to herself.

Meanwhile, Aninha begins to work at the city's chocolate factory.  The factory, considered to be the city's economical centre, raises the price of the land and generates money by creating jobs, giving the city a great deal of social status within the region. One day, while working, Ana stumbled upon a man she believed to be just another worker at the factory and befriends him, all without knowing that he is in fact the owner of the chocolate factory, Ludovico Canto e Melo.

Slowly, Danilo begins to know Aninha's kind and pure heart and they fall in love with one another, eventually spending the night together. Shortly afterwards, Ana discovers she is pregnant with his child and tells his aunt, Bárbara (Lília Cabral).
Bárbara despises Ana, as she believes Aninha to be unfit for her nephew due to her low social status, preferring for Danilo to be with Olga. However, pretends to like the girl and deceives her by promising to tell Danilo about the child, so that Ana may tell her family as well.

Ana believes Danilo knows about the child and happily gets ready for her graduation ceremony, where she is to meet him. Nonetheless, at the ceremony, when Ana is set to receive her diploma, green paint is dropped on her head and everyone laughs at her. This was planned by Danilo's aunt Bárbara and Olga, who wished to separate the young couple.

Humiliated, Ana runs away believing Danilo ordered the paint to be dropped on her, but runs into her friend Ludovico, that now reveals his identity. As they talk, she tells him of her pregnancy and of the shame she feels. Ludovico, deeply touched by Ana's selflessness for having helped him, offers to marry her so that she can avoid the shame of having a son out of wedlock, which at the time was severely frowned upon. Although at first suspicious, Ana agrees for Ludovico assures her that does it all out friendship. Before marrying, Ana vows revenge on those who harmed and humiliated her.

Ana and Ludovico promptly leave for Argentina, where she has her child, Tonico and learns to be a Lady of high society. Seven years pass and her husband succumbs to his illness, leaving her a large inheritance and the chocolate factory. Ana decides it is time to return to Ventura and make due to her promise of revenge.

Upon her return and throughout the rest of the story, Ana Francisca will be at odds with the 4 most influential people in the city - the Mayor, the Banker, the Chief of Police and her late husband's sister - who wish to control the chocolate factory for their own purposes and will try to ruins Ana's life by creating misunderstandings and false assumptions.

On the side lines, the story will also follow the population of Ventura and the comical situations they find themselves on a daily basis.

Cast

Soundtrack

National 
Cover: Mariana Ximenes

 Além do Arco-Íris - Luiza Possi
 Tristeza do Jeca - Zezé Di Camargo & Luciano

 Sensação (Baby Face) - KLB
 Encontro - Fábio Nestares
 Toda Vez que Eu Digo Adeus (Every Time We Say Goodbye) - Cássia Eller
 Voa Bicho - Milton Nascimento
 Pra Lembrar de Nós - Flávio Venturini
 Tá-Hi (Pra Você Gostar de Mim) - Eduardo Dusek
 Urubu Malandro - Abraçando Jacaré
 Sensível Demais - Nalanda
 Valsa Brasileira - Luiz Melodia
 De Um Jeito que não Sai - Leila Pinheiro
 Apanhei-te Mini Moog - Mu Carvalho
 Chocolate Com Pimenta - Deborah Blando

International 
Cover: Murilo Benício

 I'm In The Mood For Love - Rod Stewart
 Every Time We Say Goodbye - Steve Tyrell
 Hey There - Bette Midler
 (Somewhere) Over The Rainbow - Luiza Possi
 In The Mood - Glenn Miller
 Puttin' On The Ritz - Fred Astaire
 Night And Day - Ella Fitzgerald
 Mack The Knife (Moritait) - Louis Armstrong
 Stormy Weather (Keeps Rainin' All The Time) - Etta James
 Lover - John Williams & The Boston Pops
 Chocolate Waltz - The John Windsor Company
 Good Old Times - Swinging Jellys
 Curly Little Girl - Charlie Robins Band

References

External links 
  
 

2003 Brazilian television series debuts
2004 Brazilian television series endings
2003 telenovelas
2004 telenovelas
Brazilian telenovelas
TV Globo telenovelas
Telenovelas by Walcyr Carrasco
Portuguese-language telenovelas
Chocolate in fiction
Television series about revenge